Vincent Michelo Albanese (December 2, 1912 – September 2, 1984) was an American football player who played two seasons for the Brooklyn Dodgers in 1937 and in 1938. He also played in the American Association for the Paterson Panthers and Union City Rams.

References

1912 births
1984 deaths
Syracuse Orange football players
Brooklyn Dodgers (NFL) players
New York Yankees (1940 AFL) players
American football fullbacks
American football linebackers
American football cornerbacks
Players of American football from Syracuse, New York